Sir Desmond Oriel Alistair George Weston Cochrane, 3rd Baronet (22 October 1918 – 12 March 1979), was an officer in the British Army and Honorary Consul-General of Ireland for Syria and Lebanon.

Life and career
He was the son of Sir Ernest Cecil Cochrane, 2nd Baronet, and Elsa Dorothea Marie Schumacher. He was educated at Eton College. 

During the Second World War, he was a Major in the Lancashire Fusiliers in the British Army, stationed in the Middle East. Following the cessation of hostilities, he married Yvonne Sursock, only child of a Lebanese aristocrat, Alfred Bey Sursock, in 1946.

His elder brother, Ernest Henry Cochrane, MC, had died on active service as a Major in the Royal Inniskilling Fusiliers in Austria in 1945. Desmond thus succeeded his father to the Cochrane baronetcy on 6 March 1952.

He was the Honorary Consul-General of Ireland for the Republics of Syria and Lebanon, and Controller of Beirut Race Course.

References
Hankinson, C. F. J. (ed.), Debrett's Baronetage, Knightage and Companionage, 1954, Odhams Press, 1954
https://web.archive.org/web/20081121004154/http://www.irishlebanese.com/page28.html In Memoriam Sir Desmond Cochrane 1918-1979

1918 births
1979 deaths
People educated at Eton College
Lancashire Fusiliers officers
British Army personnel of World War II
Desmond
Baronets in the Baronetage of the United Kingdom